Louis William Tomlinson (born Louis Troy Austin; 24 December 1991) is an English singer and songwriter. He rose to fame as a member of the boy band One Direction. Tomlinson began his career appearing in television dramas before he auditioned on the British music competition series The X Factor in 2010. After being eliminated as a solo performer, he was placed into a group with four other contestants, forming One Direction. One Direction went on to become one of the best-selling boy bands of all time.

Following the group's hiatus in 2016, Tomlinson released "Just Hold On" as a debut solo single in December 2016. It peaked at number two on the UK Singles Chart and was certified platinum in the UK. In 2017, Tomlinson released "Back to You" with American singer Bebe Rexha (which was certified platinum in the USA and the UK) and "Miss You". In the same year, he appeared on Debrett's 2017 list of the most influential people in the UK.

In 2018, Tomlinson appeared on the fifteenth series of The X Factor as a judge and a mentor of the "Boys" category. When his mentee Dalton Harris won the competition, Tomlinson became the first former contestant of the show to become the winning mentor. The following year, Tomlinson released the singles "Two of Us", "Kill My Mind", "We Made It", "Don't Let It Break Your Heart" and "Walls". His debut solo album, Walls, was released in January 2020.

Early life and family
Louis Troy Austin was born on 24 December 1991 in Doncaster, South Yorkshire, England, to Johannah "Jay" Poulston and Troy Austin, who split up when he was a toddler. Tomlinson has some Belgian ancestry. He is estranged from his father and later took on his then stepfather Mark Tomlinson's surname, legally changing his name to Louis William Tomlinson. He was raised with four younger half-sisters; Charlotte, Félicité (2000–2019), and twins Phoebe and Daisy from Poulston's marriage to Mark. He also has three other half-siblings; a younger paternal half-sister, Georgia, and twins Doris and Ernest (born 2014) from Poulston's relationship with Dan Deakin, whom she later married.

Tomlinson attended The Hayfield School and later Hall Cross School (now Hall Cross Academy), both located in Doncaster. He failed his first year of A levels at the Hayfield School and ended up going to Hall Cross School and starting his A levels again. He had a number of jobs, including at a Vue cinema and at Doncaster Rovers football stadium as a waiter in the hospitality suites. At Hall Cross, Tomlinson appeared in several musical productions, which gave him a growing sense of ambition and determination. Taking the lead role of Danny Zuko in the Hall Cross musical production of Grease motivated him to audition for The X Factor.

Career

Early career
Tomlinson, along with two of his siblings, had extra roles in Fat Friends. After Fat Friends, he attended an acting school in Barnsley. He had small parts in an ITV drama film If I Had You and BBC's Waterloo Road.

When Tomlinson was 14, he was kicked out of a band and replaced with a new vocalist. Tomlinson has cited this experience as motivation for him to audition for The X Factor.

Tomlinson auditioned for The X Factor in 2009, but failed to progress past the producer's audition. He was determined to return the following year.

2010: The X Factor

In 2010, Tomlinson auditioned for the seventh series of the singing competition The X Factor in front of main judges Simon Cowell and Louis Walsh and guest judge Nicole Scherzinger. He sang a rendition of "Elvis Ain't Dead" by Scouting for Girls before Cowell requested he sing another song. He then sang "Hey There Delilah" by the Plain White T's and received three yeses from the judges, sending him through to bootcamp. He failed to progress to the "Boys" category at the end of the final bootcamp stage of the competition at Wembley Arena, London, in July 2010. However, after a suggestion from Scherzinger, he was put together with Niall Horan, Zayn Malik, Liam Payne and Harry Styles to form a five-piece boy band, thus qualifying for the "Groups" category at judges' houses, mentored by Cowell.

Subsequently, the group got together for two weeks to get to know each other and to practise. Styles came up with the name One Direction. For their qualifying song at judges' houses and their first song as a group, One Direction sang an acoustic version of "Torn" by Natalie Imbruglia. Cowell chose to put them through to the live shows and later commented that the performance convinced him that the group "were confident, fun, like a gang of friends and kind of fearless as well." Within the first four weeks of the live shows, the group became Cowell's last act in the competition and quickly gained popularity in the UK. One Direction finished in third place and immediately after the final their song "Forever Young", which would have been released if they had won The X Factor, was leaked onto the internet.

2011–2016: One Direction
Following The X Factor it was confirmed that One Direction had been signed by Cowell to a reported £2 million Syco Records record contract. They immediately started working on their debut album. In February 2011, a book licensed by One Direction, One Direction: Forever Young (Our Official X Factor Story), was released and topped The Sunday Times Best Seller list. That same month, the boy band and other contestants from the series participated in The X Factor Live Tour. During the tour, the group performed for 500,000 people throughout the UK. After the tour concluded in April 2011, One Direction continued working on their debut album. Recording took place in Stockholm, London and Los Angeles, as One Direction worked with producers Carl Falk, Savan Kotecha, Steve Mac and Rami Yacoub, among others.

In September 2011, One Direction's debut single, "What Makes You Beautiful", was released. A global and commercial success, it reached number one in several countries including the UK. That November, their debut studio album, Up All Night was released in the UK and Ireland. Released internationally in 2012, One Direction became the first UK group to have their debut album reach number one in the USA. Following the album's release, they headlined the Up All Night Tour. Originally, the tour was to solely take place in the UK and Ireland, but shows in Australia and North America were added due to demand. The tour was a commercial success with tickets selling out in minutes and critics raving about the group's singing abilities and stage presence. A video album of the tour, Up All Night: The Live Tour, was released in May 2012. That same month, One Direction's first book to be licensed in America, Dare to Dream: Life as One Direction, was published and topped The New York Times Best Seller list. In September 2012, the band released the song "Live While We're Young", the lead single from their second album. Another single, "Little Things", spawned the band's second number one single in the UK. Two months later, One Direction's second album, Take Me Home, was released, reaching number one in over 35 countries. Reaching number one on the Billboard 200, the group became the first boy band in US chart history to record two number-one albums in the same calendar year alongside becoming the first group since 2008 to record two number-one albums in the same year. After the album's release, the band embarked on the Take Me Home Tour. The tour took place in North America, Europe, Oceania, and Asia, grossing $114 million from 123 shows. In August 2013, One Direction: This Is Us, a 3-D documentary concert film was released, accumalting a box office gross of $68.5 million. One Direction's third book, One Direction: Where We Are: Our Band, Our Story: 100% Official, was released that same month.

On 25 November 2013, One Direction released Midnight Memories, their third studio album, which became the best-selling album worldwide in 2013 with 4 million copies sold globally. "Best Song Ever", the album's lead single, is their highest charting single in the US to date. In April 2014, the band began their third headlining concert tour, and their first all-stadium tour, the Where We Are Tour. Tickets were reported to sell out in minutes, and more shows were added due to "overwhelming demand". Performing 69 shows in Europe, North America, and South America, the band averaged 49,848 fans per show. Grossing over $290 million, the tour was the highest-grossing tour of 2014, the 15th highest-grossing concert tour of all time and is still the highest-grossing tour of all time by a vocal group. In September 2014, One Direction's fourth book, One Direction: Who We Are: Our Official Autobiography was released. One Direction: Where We Are – The Concert Film, the group's second concert film, was released in October 2014. In November 2014, One Direction's fourth album, Four, was released, making it the last album to feature Zayn Malik. Singles included "Steal My Girl" and "Night Changes", both of which achieved platinum status. Debuting at number one in 18 countries, over 3.2 million copies of the album were sold. One Direction became the only group in the 58-year history of the Billboard 200 albums chart to have their first four albums debut at number one. In support of the album, the set off on the On the Road Again Tour, grossing $208 million. In November 2015, One Direction's fifth album, Made in the A.M., was released. Singles "Drag Me Down" and "Perfect" both debuted at number one in various countries, and the album reached number one in multiple countries, including the UK, and it reached number two on the US Billboard 200. Following the release of the album, the group went on an indefinite hiatus starting in March 2016 to pursue individual projects.

Often described as forming part of a new "British Invasion" in the United States, the group have sold over 35 million records worldwide, according to the band's management company, Modest! Management. Their achievements include seven BRIT Awards, seven American Music Awards, and four MTV Video Music Awards. According to Nick Gatfield, chairman and chief executive of Sony Music Entertainment UK, One Direction represented a $50 million business empire by June 2012. They were proclaimed 2012's "Top New Artist" by Billboard. Tomlinson, along with his other band members, appeared in an episode of iCarly in spring 2012.

2015–2018: Television endeavours and first solo projects
Tomlinson again appeared on The X Factor during the twelfth series in 2015, assisting mentor and label boss Cowell with his decisions in the "Over 26s" category during the judges' houses stage. Tomlinson also indicated he would be interested in becoming a permanent X Factor judge during the group's hiatus if he was asked. In 2015, Tomlinson created his own record label, Triple Strings Ltd, as an imprint of his current label Syco. It was reported he was working with Cowell to create a girl band and held auditions in 2015.
Tomlinson released "Just Hold On", a collaborative effort with American DJ Steve Aoki on 10 December 2016. Tomlinson and Aoki performed the song live for the first time on The X Factor thirteenth series final on the day of its release. Tomlinson dedicated the song and performance to his late mother. The single debuted and peaked at number 2 on the UK Singles Chart and reached number one on the Billboard Dance/Electronic Digital Song Sales chart.

In July 2017, Tomlinson released the single "Back to You" featuring Bebe Rexha and Digital Farm Animals. The song peaked at number 8 on the UK Singles Chart and number 40 on the Billboard Hot 100 chart. Later, it was announced that Tomlinson had signed a record deal with Epic Records. In October 2017 Tomlinson released a promotional single "Just Like You" which peaked at 99 on UK Official Charts. Following that he released his second solo single "Miss You" in December 2017 which peaked at 39 on the UK Charts.

On 17 July 2018, it was announced that Tomlinson would judge alongside Cowell and fellow new judges Robbie Williams and Ayda Field on the fifteenth series of The X Factor. Tomlinson mentored the "Boys" category, and chose Dalton Harris, Armstrong Martins, Brendan Murray, and Anthony Russell to go through to the live shows. Tomlinson subsequently became the show's first former contestant to secure a victory as the winning mentor during the final when Harris won the show.

2019–2022: Walls and Away From Home Festivals
In February 2019, it was announced that Tomlinson had signed with newly-relaunched Arista Records; his first release under the label, "Two of Us", was released on 7 March 2019.

In August 2019, Tomlinson announced that his debut solo album will be released in early 2020. Tomlinson released a single, "Kill My Mind", on 5 September 2019.

On 23 October 2019, Tomlinson released another single, "We Made It". That same day, he also announced that he would be embarking on the Louis Tomlinson World Tour, spanning over five months and visiting 20 countries. Furthermore, he announced that his debut album was entitled Walls and was scheduled to be released on 31 January 2020.
On 23 November 2019, Tomlinson released "Don't Let It Break Your Heart", the fourth single from his debut album. On 17 January 2020, he released "Walls", the fifth and the final single from his debut album.
On 31 January 2020, his debut solo album Walls was released. The album debuted at number 4 on the UK Albums Chart and number 9 on the Billboard 200 chart, making it the first new album for Arista Records in almost nine years to hit the top 10 on the chart. Tomlinson was set to embark on tour for the majority of 2020 and played two shows in March of that same year before he was forced to postpone nearly every date early in the COVID-19 pandemic. In July, he announced the rescheduled dates for 2021, and then again to 2022. Following the postponements, Tomlinson embarked on the remainder of the tour in February 2022, playing a total of 81 shows for the tour.

In July 2020, Tomlinson announced that he had parted ways with Syco Music; he further announced he had begun writing his next album. Tomlinson held a digital concert Live From London on 12 December 2020, which sold over 160 thousand tickets, breaking records as the most livestreamed concert for a male solo artist of the year and the third overall. The proceeds went to various charities such as FareShare, Crew Nation, Bluebell Wood Children’s Hospice, Stagehand, as well as to tour crew who were struggling financially due to the COVID-19 pandemic. As of 2021, Tomlinson holds a Guinness World Record for most tickets sold for a live-streamed concert by a solo male artist.

In May 2021, Tomlinson announced that he had signed a global deal with BMG to release his second album. In July 2021, Tomlinson announced that he would be celebrating the return of live music by performing at The Away From Home Festival, curated and conceived by him, on 30 August 2021 in London, with The Snuts and Bilk as supporting artists. On 30 August 2022, Tomlinson hosted the second annual The Away From Home Festival at Marenostrum Music Castle Park in Málaga on Costa del Sol, featuring artists such as The Vaccines and The Snuts. The festival attracted 17,000 fans and received positive reviews.

2022: Faith in the Future
In August 2022, it was announced that Tomlinson's second studio album was finished. That same month, tracks from the album were leaked, with Tomlinson saying he was "gutted". On 31 August, Tomlinson announced that his second album Faith in the Future would be released on 11 November 2022. The album's lead single, "Bigger Than Me", was released on 1 September. On 8 February, 2023, Tomlinson announced that a documentary titled All Of Those Voices, described as a "refreshingly raw and real look at Louis Tomlinson's musical journey", would be released in cinemas on 22 March.

Artistry
Tomlinson contributed more in songwriting to One Direction than any other band member. He had songwriting credits on the majority of the songs on Midnight Memories, Four, and Made in the A.M., and on a total of 38 songs across the band's discography, including six hit singles and two songs, "No Control" and "Home", that became the subjects of fan-created promotional projects. Savan Kotecha credits Tomlinson with "leading the charge" in shifting 1D's music towards a more mature sound.

Tomlinson's early influences and favourite artists include Robbie Williams, The Fray, and Ed Sheeran. In an interview with Now magazine, he said: "I've always loved Robbie. He's just so cheeky, he can get away with anything. His performances are unbelievable." He described Sheeran as "phenomenal".

For his solo music, Tomlinson's first few singles ranged in genre, beginning with EDM and synthpop before shifting towards a rockier sound. In an interview with BBC Music following the release of "Miss You", Tomlinson said lyrically his debut album is inspired by Arctic Monkeys and Oasis. He has also cited an admiration for and inspiration from Sam Fender, Amy Winehouse, Catfish and the Bottlemen, and James. He declared:

On a review of "Kill My Mind", MTV News wrote "Louis Tomlinson sounds like the Britpop star he was born to be." His music style has been referred to as indie rock, soft rock, indie pop, Britpop, pop punk, pop rock and pop.

Football

Tomlinson, whose previous football experience had been to play and run his own pub team called Three Horseshoes, had agreed to play in a charity game at the Keepmoat Stadium in his home town of Doncaster to raise money for the Bluebell Wood Charity and was offered a deal by professional football club Doncaster Rovers to join the club on non-contract terms after impressing in the game. The deal was brokered for Tomlinson to be a development player and to participate in reserve games, working around his music commitments with One Direction. He was given the squad number 28 for the 2013–14 season. Tomlinson said of the move: "It's unbelievable really. I have been a massive football fan for a long time and growing up in Doncaster, I've been to plenty of games at the Keepmoat. To be part of the club is incredible." Rovers manager Paul Dickov joked, "He's missed pre-season training and he's having a holiday in America, so we'd better get him over here pretty soon."

On 3 September 2013, it was announced that Tomlinson would make his debut for Doncaster's Reserve team in their Central League fixture against the Scunthorpe United reserve team on 18 September. Doncaster announced that despite the fixture being a reserve game they would be setting up a special ticket line for the match. On 8 September, Tomlinson played for Celtic in another charity match for Stiliyan Petrov. During the game Tomlinson was injured following a tackle by Aston Villa and England striker Gabriel Agbonlahor and was substituted straight away. The tackle consequently caused Agbonlahor to receive abuse from One Direction fans on his Twitter account, and brought an apology from the player. As a result of injuries sustained in the match, Tomlinson was then forced to pull out of the Scunthorpe match, relegating himself to the bench.

His rescheduled debut for Doncaster's reserve side in the Central League came as a 65th-minute substitute in a 0–0 game against Rotherham United on 26 February 2014, a charity match in aid of Bluebell Wood Children's Hospice attended by a crowd in excess of 4,000. Tomlinson later participated in bandmate Niall Horan's Charity Football Challenge on 26 May 2014, at the King Power Stadium.

On 19 June 2014, Tomlinson and former chairman John Ryan confirmed they had taken over as joint-owners of Doncaster Rovers. It was later announced the takeover had fallen through, though Tomlinson continues to be involved with the club.

Tomlinson returned to Celtic Park on 7 September 2014, to take part in the MAESTRIO Charity Match, having been recruited to play for Rio Ferdinand's All-Stars against Paul McStay's Maestros. The match was attended by a crowd of around 25,000 with proceeds benefiting several charities including UNICEF, War Child, the Celtic Foundation and the Rio Ferdinand Foundation.

Philanthropy
Whilst One Direction has put forth group efforts towards charity work, Tomlinson himself has also been involved in charity work outside the band. He, along with band member Payne, co-hosted a charity ball held in honour of Believe in Magic, an organisation that supports terminally ill children. Both Tomlinson and Payne got in a bidding war at the charity ball which resulted in Tomlinson donating £10,000 for Payne's face to be painted. He personally donated £2 million to Believe in Magic, while collectively he and Payne donated over £5 million. Fellow band members Niall Horan and Harry Styles could not attend the event, but also donated items to be auctioned off for Believe in Magic.

Tomlinson has been involved with charity work for several years. He has been thoroughly involved with Bluebell Wood Children's Hospice and is one their patrons. Tomlinson tends to get active social media to help boost support and awareness for his charity work. For his 23rd birthday, One Direction fans established a donation drive for Bluebell Wood Children's Hospice and set the bar high for the donation target. Tomlinson also turned to social media along with some of his family members for the charity Niamh's Next Step. This gained the charity several hundred followers on their Twitter account which drew in more awareness to the cause. During One Direction's hiatus, Tomlinson wants to increase his charity work with his newly found free time. He says about the charity work: "Being my age and being able to be in a position where I can help people out and give opportunities to other people is the most exciting thing to me." According to Sarah Hext, whose son Harvey and family were personally supported by Tomlinson and his mother, "People don't know the real Louis, Jay has told me that when Louis suffers a bad press day he says to her 'come on mum, lets make someone happy today.' That's the kind of man Louis is."

In April 2016, Tomlinson was announced to be joining the Soccer Aid 2016 star line-up, an biennial fundraiser for the children's organisation UNICEF. He played for the England squad alongside Robbie Williams, Olly Murs, Paddy McGuinness, Jack Whitehall, Marvin Humes, John Bishop and others on 5 June 2016. Tomlinson played against his bandmate Niall Horan, who appeared for the Rest of the World team.

Tomlinson shared donation links, made donations himself, and voiced his support for the Black Lives Matter movement in May and June 2020. He attended the George Floyd protests in London with his now ex-girlfriend Eleanor Calder.

Personal life
Tomlinson began dating then-student Eleanor Calder in November 2011. They split in March 2015, got back together in early 2017, and broke up again in late 2022, as announced in January 2023. In July 2015, it was reported that Tomlinson was expecting a baby with then 23-year-old stylist, Briana Jungwirth. On 4 August 2015, on Good Morning America, the reports were confirmed. Tomlinson and Jungwirth welcomed a son on 21 January 2016. Tomlinson was in a relationship with actress Danielle Campbell from November 2015 to December 2016.

In December 2016, Tomlinson's mother, Johannah Deakin, died of leukaemia. In March 2019, Tomlinson's younger sister, Félicité Tomlinson, died from an accidental overdose. Tomlinson owned a home in Los Angeles, but put it up for sale in 2020. He owns a home in Hertfordshire.

On 4 March 2017, an altercation at Los Angeles International Airport involving a paparazzo and aggressive fans waiting for the singer resulted in Tomlinson being detained by airport security and initially being charged with a misdemeanor, posting bail soon after. The matter was reportedly resolved by April 2017 and charges against Tomlinson were dropped, citing the footage of the events captured by another paparazzo that had surfaced soon after. Tomlinson's lawyer Marty Singer said in a statement to Rolling Stone, "The paparazzi provoked and caused the altercation with Louis at the airport this morning. This is not the first or the last time that a paparazzi [sic] has created an altercation with a celebrity."

Filmography
Film

Television

DiscographyStudio albums'''
 Walls (2020)
 Faith in the Future'' (2022)

Awards and nominations

Tours

Headlining
 Louis Tomlinson World Tour (2020–2022)
 Faith in the Future World Tour (2023)

See also
 Larries, shipping fandom which centers on Tomlinson

References

External links

1991 births
Living people
21st-century English male actors
21st-century English singers
21st-century British male singers
Arista Records artists
Association football defenders
Doncaster Rovers F.C. players
English footballers
English male singer-songwriters
English male television actors
English people of Belgian descent
English philanthropists
English pop rock singers
English pop singers
Male actors from Yorkshire
MTV Europe Music Award winners
Musicians from Yorkshire
One Direction members
People from Doncaster
The X Factor (British TV series) contestants